Joshua Taylor Bassett (born December 22, 2000) is an American actor, singer and songwriter. He is known for his starring role as Ricky Bowen in High School Musical: The Musical: The Series.

Early life 
Bassett was born and raised in Oceanside, California, to parents Taylor and Laura. He has five sisters, and was home-schooled.

His first introduction to musical theater was at age eight, over a decade before he starred as Ricky in High School Musical: The Musical: The Series, when he was in a community theater production of High School Musical on Stage!. Since then, Bassett has starred in over 30 musical productions. He moved to Los Angeles when he was 16 years old to start acting, living in his car for some time to get by.

Career 
From 2017 to 2018, Bassett appeared in episodic roles in the television shows: Lethal Weapon, Game Shakers, and Dirty John.

His first substantial role was in early 2018 when he starred as Aidan Peters in the third and final season of the Disney Channel comedy television series Stuck in the Middle. In August 2018, Bassett portrayed the role of Matt in a staged reading of the musical Calvin Berger. The production ran from August 10 through August 12 at the Hudson Backstage Theatre in Hollywood, California. In October 2018, it was reported he was cast in his first major role, as the male lead Ricky Bowen, on Disney+'s mockumentary musical drama streaming television series High School Musical: The Musical: The Series. 

In early 2019, Bassett appeared in a guest roleas Linus, a recovering teenage drug addict who is rushed to the hospital after an overdoseon the fifteenth season of the television series Grey's Anatomy. In July 2019, he was featured on American musician August Kamp's song "Evergreen", of the latter's debut studio album, 19: The Musical. In November 2019, High School Musical: The Musical: The Series debuted on Disney+. Bassett co-wrote the duet "Just for a Moment" with co-star Olivia Rodrigo for the series' soundtrack, the latter which was released on January 10, 2020. Both, the debut season and his performance received positive reviews. Shannon Miller of The A.V. Club praised him for his talent, musical ability and "handling of dramatic material", and Kayla Cobb of Decider stated that Bassett has significant romantic chemistry with Rodrigo. Megan Peters of Comicbook wrote that Bassett "will endear fans with his plucky determination to do Troy justice". In December 2019, Bassett appeared in the documentary special, High School Musical: The Musical: The Series: The Special, which was released on Disney+.

In early 2020, Bassett signed with talent and entertainment company United Talent Agency, as well as signed a recording contract with Warner Records. He released his debut single, "Common Sense", on music platforms on April 3, 2020. Later that month, Bassett appeared in the television special, The Disney Family Singalong, in which he performed "We're All In This Together" from High School Musical alongside the film's cast as well as cast members from the Zombies and Descendants franchises. In May 2020, he was nominated for the Favorite Male TV Star category at the 33rd Nickelodeon Kids' Choice Awards for his role in High School Musical: The Musical: The Series. Bassett's second single, "Anyone Else", was released on July 16, 2020. In August 2020, he was a guest star participant on Nickelodeon's reality game series Unfiltered. In October 2020, in an interview, Bassett revealed that he had worked on his six track debut EP which would be released soon. In December 2020, Bassett appeared in the holiday special, High School Musical: The Musical: The Holiday Special, in which he performed "The Perfect Gift", an original song from the then-upcoming second season of the series and a cover of "Little Saint Nick" along with Matt Cornett. The special was released on Disney+ while both songs were included in the accompanying soundtrack album which was released in late November. That same month, he revealed in an interview with Good Morning America that his debut EP would be released in early 2021.

On January 14, 2021, Bassett released "Lie Lie Lie", the lead single from his then-upcoming debut EP, with a R3hab remix and an acoustic piano version released the following month. The song peaked in the top thirty on the US Bubbling Under Hot 100 and in the top ninety on the OOC UK Singles, becoming his first entry on both charts. Bassett had shared a snippet of the song on Instagram under the title, "I Know", back in late 2019 when the song had not entered production. He followed it up with the second single from his EP, "Only a Matter Of Time", released on January 28, 2021. In February 2021, Limbo, a short film that he had filmed back in 2015, was released on Amazon Prime Video and Vimeo On Demand. Despite the delayed release, the short film marked his film debut. Bassett played Caleb, an estranged young boy who reconnects with his father, the latter who is on a journey of self-reflection. Later that month, he revealed the track listing, cover art, and release date of his EP. On March 12, 2021, Bassett's self-titled debut EP was released. He wrote, co-produced five of six tracks in the record, and played six instruments throughout the body of work. The EP's subject matter centers on heartbreak, love, regret, and betrayal. 

That same month, Bassett was once again nominated for the Favorite Male TV Star category at the 34th Nickelodeon Kids' Choice Awards, for High School Musical: The Musical: The Series. In April 2021, he conducted a one-night virtual concert titled "A Night with Joshua Bassett", in which he performed ten songs, including an unreleased song titled "LA", and a cover of "Drops of Jupiter", backed by a full band from EastWest Studios in Los Angeles. The virtual concert was broadcast live on his website, while tickets were up for sale on his merchandise store. It was also recorded and later released as a concert film on Prime Video, iTunes, Vudu, and Microsoft Movies & TV. In May 2021, Bassett released a single titled "Feel Something". He co-directed the music video for the song with fellow creative specialist Sarah Carpenter. Later that month, he reprised his role as Ricky Bowen in the second season of High School Musical: The Musical: The Series. Bassett wrote the Christmas themed original song, "The Perfect Gift", for the sophomore season's soundtrack. Despite of the season receiving a mixed response from critics and viewers, his performance was praised. In October 2021, Billboard placed Bassett in its Billboard 21 Under 21 list, which represented rising artists in the music industry under the age of 21. In December 2021, he released his second EP that consisted of a trio of singles, titled "Set Me Free", "Crisis", and "Secret". The EP was titled after the three songs; Bassett served as a co-creative director for the music videos of the songs.

In February 2022, Bassett released a single titled "Doppelgänger", co-directing the music video for the song with YouTuber and fellow creative Elle Mills. He co-starred along with actor and dancer Ciara Riley Wilson and social media personality Chelsey Amaro in the music video. The following month, he became a brand ambassador for clothing retailer American Eagle's "Members Always: Future Together" campaign alongside Madelyn Cline, Maitreyi Ramakrishnan, Michael Evans Behling, Coco Gauff, and Mxmtoon. In April 2022, Bassett starred in a supporting role as Anthony, the protagonist's older brother, in the Disney+ original musical comedy film Better Nate Than Ever, directed and written by Tim Federle and based on his 2013 novel of the same name. The film received generally positive reviews. TJ O'Connell stated that his performance as Anthony "truly brings so much emotional weight to this movie. He represents that approval we need that we think is out of reach." while Joshua Axelrod of Pittsburgh Post-Gazette wrote that Bassett "sells Anthony’s growth as he finally begins to understand his little brother". Later that month, he won the award for Favorite Male TV Star (Kids) at the 35th Nickelodeon Kids' Choice Awards for his performance as Ricky Bowen in High School Musical: The Musical: The Series. In May 2022, Bassett announced his eponymous debut concert tour featuring stops in the United States, Canada, and Europe. In July 2022, he appeared as a contestant on the ninth season of Celebrity Family Feud, playing for the nonprofit organization, Make-A-Wish, along with other High School Musical: The Musical: The Series cast members. The same month, Bassett reprised his role as Ricky for the third season of High School Musical: The Musical The Series. He wrote and produced the original song "Finally Free", which appears in the first episode of the season.

Philanthropy
In January 2021, Bassett opened his online merchandise store, donating 100% of his proceeds from the merchandise to charity. Current charities that his merchandise store supports include Bring Change to Mind, Teen Line, and Sunrise Movement. Other charities that Bassett's merchandise store has supported include Court Appointed Special Advocates, Jack.org, The Young Feminist Fund, and A Long Walk Home.

Bassett donated 100% of his proceeds from his song "Crisis", the lead single from his December 2021 EP Crisis / Secret / Set Me Free, to mental health organizations. In addition, Bassett donated one dollar for every pre-save of said EP to mental health organizations, raising over twenty thousand dollars. Additionally, Bassett donated a portion of every VIP ticket for his upcoming American/European tour to a charity of the buyer's choice.

In March 2022, Bassett was selected to be an ambassador for the American Eagle "Members Always: Future Together" philanthropic campaign. Through this initiative, the brand will award $200,000 in grants to twenty young people igniting change in their communities. For Mental Health Awareness Month, Bassett, through the program, partnered with mental health awareness nonprofit organization Bring Change to Mind and was a speaker on mental health to local LA high school students at the organization's SoCal Summit.

In August 2022, Bassett was included on the Variety Power of Young Hollywood Impact List and invited to a gala hosted in partnership with Facebook Gaming. As part of the event, Bassett competed in a charity gaming tournament where each impact list honoree chose a charity of their choice to donate all their winnings to. Bassett chose to support Planned Parenthood. He ended up winning the tournament and donating $10,000 to Planned Parenthood.

In September 2022, Bassett released his third EP, Sad Songs in a Hotel Room. The second single of the project, "Lifeline", was a song dedicated to his mother, who was by his side while he was deathly ill in 2021. Bassett donated 100% of the proceeds for "Lifeline" to "organizations that are a lifeline for others". In addition, with the release of the single, he announced that he was creating an organization called "Find My Lifeline", a haven to provide people with support and lifelines for those who may not have a friend or family member to turn to.

Personal life
Bassett sings and plays piano, guitar, ukulele, bass, drums, and some saxophone. On May 10, 2021, he came out as a member of the LGBTQ+ community during an interview.

In January 2021, Bassett became seriously ill and was hospitalized with septic shock and heart failure: "[The doctors] told me that I had a 30% chance of survival. They told me that if I had not checked into the hospital within 12 hours, I would have been found [dead] in my apartment."

In August 2021, Bassett revealed in an interview that he had dealt with negative body image issues that developed into "serious problems" around the time the first season of High School Musical: The Musical: The Series was airing.

In December 2021, Bassett disclosed that he experienced sexual abuse as a child and teen.

Discography

Studio albums
 Complicated (TBA)

Compilation albums

Soundtrack albums

Extended plays

Singles

Promotional singles

Other appearances

Tours

Headlining
 Joshua Bassett's Tour 2022 (2022)
 The Complicated Tour (2023)

Filmography

Television

Film

Stage

Awards and nominations

Listicles

References

External links
 

2000 births
21st-century American male actors
21st-century American male singers
21st-century American singers
21st-century American LGBT people
American male child actors
American male television actors
LGBT male actors
LGBT people from California
American LGBT singers
Living people
People from Oceanside, California